Bengal Homoeopathic Medical College and Hospital is a homeopathic medical college in Asansol West Bengal, India. it was established in 1980. It offers the Bachelor of Homeopathic Medicine and Surgery (BHMS) degree course. This college is recognized by the National Commission for Homoeopathy (NCH), Ministry of Ayush and affiliated with the West Bengal University of Health Sciences.

Homeopathy was introduced in India the early 19th century. It flourished in Bengal at first, and then spread all over India. In the beginning, the system was extensively practiced by amateurs in the civil and military services and others. Mahendra Lal Sircar was the first Indian who became a homeopathic physician.

References

External links

1980 establishments in West Bengal
Educational institutions established in 1980
Homeopathic hospitals
Hospitals established in 1980
Hospitals in West Bengal
Universities and colleges in Paschim Bardhaman district
Homoeopathic Medical Colleges in West Bengal
Affiliates of West Bengal University of Health Sciences